Dorra Mahfoudhi (born 7 August 1993) is a Tunisian athlete specialising in the pole vault. She won several medals on continental level.

Her personal best in the event are 4.31 metres outdoors (Rabat 2019) and 3.40 metres indoors (Bordeaux 2011).

Competition record

References

External links
All-Athletics profile

1993 births
Living people
Tunisian female pole vaulters
Athletes (track and field) at the 2010 Summer Youth Olympics
African Games medalists in athletics (track and field)
African Games gold medalists for Tunisia
Athletes (track and field) at the 2015 African Games
Athletes (track and field) at the 2019 African Games
African Championships in Athletics winners
African Games gold medalists in athletics (track and field)
Athletes (track and field) at the 2018 Mediterranean Games
Mediterranean Games competitors for Tunisia
21st-century Tunisian women